DWML may refer to:

DWML, former callsign of DWII-FM, a radio station in Legazpi, Albay, Philippines
DWML (Radyo Natin Atimonan), a radio station in Atimonan, Quezon, Philippines, that is part of the Radyo Natin Network